Italian submarine Neghelli was an  built for the Royal Italian Navy (Regia Marina) during the 1930s. It was named after a town of Negele in Ethiopia.

Design and description
The Adua-class submarines were essentially repeats of the preceding . They displaced  surfaced and  submerged.

For surface running, the boats were powered by two  diesel engines, each driving one propeller shaft. When submerged each propeller was driven by a  electric motor. They could reach  on the surface and  underwater.

The boats were armed with six internal  torpedo tubes, four in the bow and two in the stern. They were also armed with one  deck gun for combat on the surface. The light anti-aircraft armament consisted of one or two pairs of   machine guns.

Construction and career
Neghelli was launched on 7 November 1937 in OTO's shipyard in La Spezia and commissioned on 28 February 1938.  After an endurance training in the Dodecanese, Neghelli was assigned to Leros. In May of 1940 she was reassigned to 15th Squadron (I Submarine Group) based at La Spezia. Her commander at the time was Carlo Ferracuti.

At the outbreak of hostilities she immediately was sent on a mission to the west part of the Gulf of Genoa and returned on 14 June 1940 without encountering any enemy traffic.

Italian submarines stayed on patrol until 9 August, however, Force H passed north of the area patrolled by Italian submarines, and they were not able to detect it. On 5 August 1940 at approximately 18:50 Neghelli, while located west of Asinara, was attacked by an enemy submarine. Neghelli managed to avoid two torpedoes by maneuvering.

In December 1940 she was sent on a new mission to patrol an area 45 miles north of Marsa Matruh until Christmas.

On 13 December 1940, at 20:22 while patrolling on the surface in an area 45 miles north of Marsa Matruh in the position , she sighted a British cruiser thought to be . Neghelli closed in and at 20:36 fired a spread of four torpedoes, stayed on the surface to observe the results. One torpedo hit the target, which turned out to be . The cruiser opened fire in the direction of the submarine, forcing her to dive and move away.  was damaged and was forced to return to Alexandria for repairs which lasted until 20 January 1941 and didn't return to action until late March 1941.

Neghelli'''s heroics were reported in the war bulletin no. 191 of 15 December 1940, claiming the sinking of the British cruiser. Captain Ferracuti was decorated with a Silver Medal of Military Valor for this attack.

On 14 January 1941 Neghelli departed from Leros for an offensive mission targeting traffic in and out of Piraeus. No news were heard from her since the departure. From the British documents released after the war, it appears that on 19 January 1941 Neghelli first attacked Greek destroyer Psara early in the morning, then at 11:53 she attacked British convoy AS-12 heading from Piraeus to Alexandria. The remaining destroyers counterattacked with depth charges, and finally  was able to hit the submarine, which sank with all hands 40 miles northeast of Falkonera.

Notes

References
 

Adua-class submarines
World War II submarines of Italy
Lost submarines of Italy
Maritime incidents in January 1941
World War II shipwrecks in the Mediterranean Sea
1937 ships
Ships built by OTO Melara
Ships built in La Spezia
Ships lost with all hands
Submarines sunk by British warships